Gerald Garrick Cunningham (3 September 1945 – 1 July 2019) was a New Zealand author, photographer, historian and businessman.

Born in Dunedin in the South Island of New Zealand, he lived in that city and in Central Otago, before moving to Auckland in 1957. Educated at Auckland Grammar School (1958–1962) he was employed by the Bank of New Zealand, Wright Stephenson & Co and Taylor Trading Company. In 1972 he established Company Forty Five Ltd., a business involved in the import, manufacture and wholesale of paintings and art prints to the retail trade throughout New Zealand. During 2001 he moved to the village of Lauder in Central Otago to retire. Since that date he has written four books published by Reed Publishing NZ Ltd., a New Zealand company which was taken over by Penguin NZ, an offshoot of the multinational publisher, Penguin Group, in 2009. A fifth book was published by Penguin NZ in 2009, with a sixth & seventh published by Bateman Publishing Ltd in 2011 & 2013. He died on 1 July 2019 at the Royal Brisbane Hospital after suffering a massive stroke.

Works
Guide to the Otago Central Rail Trail Reed Publishing NZ Ltd, first published 2003, reprinted 2004,2005,2007 and republished by Penguin NZ in 2009.
Guide to the Otago Goldfields Heritage Trail, Blue Lake (Otago), Reed Publishing NZ Ltd, 2004, republished by Penguin NZ in 2008
Illustrated History of Central Otago & the Queenstown Lakes District Skippers Canyon Reed Publishing NZ Ltd., 2005
Otago Central Rail Trail – A Pictorial Journey- Reed Publishing NZ Ltd., 2007
Central Otago – A Special Place- Penguin NZ, 2009,
The Taieri Gorge Railway – Bateman Publishing Ltd, 2011
Skippers & The Shotover River, Queenstown – Bateman Publishing Ltd, 2013

References

Writers from Dunedin
2019 deaths
1945 births
New Zealand photographers
21st-century New Zealand historians
New Zealand businesspeople
People educated at Auckland Grammar School